Kenneth Anderson is a law professor at Washington College of Law, American University, a research fellow of the Hoover Institution at Stanford University, a Non-Resident Visiting Fellow at the Brookings Institution, and a blogger.

Anderson was the legal editor of Crimes of War, a book about international humanitarian law (W.W. Norton, 1999).

He is a member of the International Council of the New York-based Human Rights Foundation.

Anderson supports legally recognizing same-sex marriages.

He graduated from UCLA and Harvard Law School.

Selected publication
with Richard Anderson. "Limitations of the Liberal-Legal Model of International Human Rights: Six Lessons from El Salvador". Telos 64 (Summer 1985). New York: Telos Press

Notes

External links
Kenneth Anderson's Law of War and Just War Theory Blog
Review by Kenneth Anderson of the book “The Parliament of Man: The Past, Present and Future of the United Nations”, by Paul Kennedy. Revista de Libros

American legal scholars
American legal writers
Hoover Institution people
International law scholars
Year of birth missing (living people)
Living people
American University faculty and staff
University of California, Los Angeles alumni
Harvard Law School alumni
American bloggers